The 1894–95 Rugby Union County Championship was the seventh edition of England's premier rugby union club competition at the time.

Yorkshire won the competition for the sixth time, defeating Cumberland in the decisive tie of the Championship Series.

Group stage

Group winners

South-western group

 Devon beat Gloucestershire 16 – 9 on 17 November 1894.

 Eight Cornish players made their championship debut. Three Somerset players were England internationals.

Championship series

Decisive match

See also
 English rugby union system
 Rugby union in England

References

Rugby Union County Championship
County Championship (rugby union) seasons